Coptosia behen is a species of beetle in the family Cerambycidae. It was described by Sama and Rejzek in 1999. It is known from Turkey. It feeds on Centaurea urvillei.

References

Saperdini
Beetles described in 1999